Cychrus caraboides is a species of ground beetle.

It is found in Belarus, Benelux, Great Britain including the Isle of Man, Estonia, Finland, mainland France, Hungary, the Republic of Ireland, Kaliningrad, Latvia, Moldova, Northern Ireland, Romania, Russia, mainland Spain, Ukraine, Scandinavia, the Balkans, and everywhere in Central Europe.

References

External links

caraboides
Beetles described in 1758
Beetles of Europe
Taxa named by Carl Linnaeus